Iliya Topalov (born 10 November 1926) was a Bulgarian gymnast. He competed in eight events at the 1952 Summer Olympics.

References

External links
 

1926 births
Possibly living people
Bulgarian male artistic gymnasts
Olympic gymnasts of Bulgaria
Gymnasts at the 1952 Summer Olympics
Place of birth missing